Isopentane, also called methylbutane or 2-methylbutane, is a branched-chain saturated hydrocarbon (an alkane) with five carbon atoms, with formula  or .

Isopentane is an volatile and flammable liquid. It is one of three structural isomers with the molecular formula C5H12, the others being pentane (n-pentane) and neopentane (dimethyl propane).

Isopentane is commonly used in conjunction with liquid nitrogen to achieve a liquid bath temperature of −160 °C. Natural gas typically contains 1% or less isopentane, but it is a significant component of natural gasoline.

Nomenclature
The traditional name isopentane was still retained in the 1993 IUPAC recommendations, but is no longer recommended according to the 2013 recommendations. The preferred IUPAC name is the systematic name 2-methylbutane. An isopentyl group is a subset of the generic pentyl group. It has the chemical structure -CH3CH2CH(CH3)2.

Uses
Isopentane is used in a closed loop in geothermal power production to drive turbines.

Isopentane is used, in conjunction with dry ice or liquid nitrogen, to freeze tissues for cryosectioning in histology.

Isopentane is a major component (sometimes 30% or more) of natural gasoline, an analog of common petroleum-derived gasoline that is condensed from natural gas.  It has a substantially higher octane rating (RON 93.7) than n-pentane (61.7), and therefore there is interest in conversion from the latter.

References

External links
 International Chemical Safety Card 1153
IUPAC Nomenclature of Organic Chemistry (online version of the "Blue Book")

Alkanes